Migratory Bird Sanctuaries are created in Canada under the Migratory Birds Convention Act, 1994. They are administered by the Canadian Wildlife Service. The first sanctuary in North America, Last Mountain Lake Bird Sanctuary, was created by federal order-in-council in 1887.

Provinces

Alberta
There are four Migratory Bird Sanctuaries in Alberta.

British Columbia
There are seven Migratory Bird Sanctuaries in British Columbia.

Manitoba
Currently there are no Migratory Bird Sanctuaries in the province of Manitoba.

New Brunswick
There are three Migratory Bird Sanctuaries in New Brunswick.

Newfoundland and Labrador
There are three Migratory Bird Sanctuaries in Newfoundland and Labrador.

Nova Scotia
There are seven Migratory Bird Sanctuaries in Nova Scotia.

Ontario
There are nine Migratory Bird Sanctuaries in Ontario.

Quebec
There are twenty-eight  Migratory Bird Sanctuaries in Quebec.

Prince Edward Island
There is one Migratory Bird Sanctuaries on Prince Edward Island.

Saskatchewan
There are fifteen Migratory Bird Sanctuaries in Saskatchewan.

Territories

Northwest Territories
There are five Migratory Bird Sanctuaries in the Northwest Territories.

Nunavut
There are eleven Migratory Bird Sanctuaries in the Nunavut Territory.

Yukon
There are no Migratory Bird Sanctuaries in the Yukon Territory.

See also
List of National Wildlife Areas in Canada
List of Canadian protected areas

References

External links
 Environment and Climate Change Canada - Migratory Bird Sanctuaries
 Department of Justice: Migratory Bird Sanctuary Regulations (C.R.C., c. 1036)

Canada geography-related lists
Lists of protected areas of Canada
 
Lists of tourist attractions in Canada
Migratory Bird